The Amalgamated Society of Watermen, Lightermen and Bargemen was a trade union in the United Kingdom.

The union was founded in 1889 as the Amalgamated Society of Watermen and Lightermen of the River Thames.  In 1901, it merged with the Watchmen's Union of the River Thames to form the Amalgamated Society of Watermen, Lightermen and Watchers of the River Thames.  It merged with the Medway Sailors and Bargemen's Union in 1912 when it adopted its final name.  It merged with the Transport and General Workers' Union in 1922.

Election results
The union affiliated to the Labour Party, and stood its general secretary in the 1918 UK general election.

See also

 List of trade unions
 Transport and General Workers' Union
 TGWU amalgamations

References

Defunct trade unions of the United Kingdom
1889 establishments in the United Kingdom
Port workers' trade unions
Transport and General Workers' Union amalgamations
Trade unions established in 1889
Trade unions based in London